The 42nd Reconnaissance Escadrille was a unit of the Polish Air Force at the start of World War II. The unit was attached to the Pomorze Army.

Aircraft

10 PZL.23B Karaś
1 RWD-8

Pilots
 Por. pil. Mieczysław Lewandowski
 Por. pil. Romuald Suliński
 Sierż. pil. Władysław Zołnowski
 Kpr. pil. Wacław Banaszuk
 Kpr. pil. Edward Hajdukiewicz
 Kpr. pil. Mieczysław Ligęza
 Kpr. pil. Konrád Muchowski
 Kpr. pil. Zbigniew Perkowski
 Kpr. pil. Paweł Przybylak
 Kpr. pil. Aleksander Sowiński
 Kpr. pil. Ludwik Steinke
 Kpr. pil. Stefan Wojciechowski

See also
Polish Air Force order of battle in 1939

Polish Air Force escadrilles